Cadillac Records: Music From the Motion Picture is a soundtrack album for the film Cadillac Records. It features covers of classic songs from Chess Records' singers as performed by the film's actors including Beyoncé (as Etta James), Eamonn Walker (as Howlin' Wolf) and Jeffrey Wright (as Muddy Waters). It also features original songs from contemporary artists such as Beyoncé's sister, R&B singer Solange Knowles and rapper Nas. The soundtrack has been released in single and double-disc editions. 

The soundtrack was nominated for a 2010 Grammy Award for Best Compilation Soundtrack Album for a Motion Picture, Television or Other Visual Media. It lost out to the soundtrack from Slumdog Millionaire. Additionally, Beyoncé's "At Last", released as the only single from the soundtrack, won a Grammy for the Best Traditional R&B Vocal Performance. Another one of the songs from the soundtrack, "Once In a Lifetime", also by Beyoncé, was nominated for a Grammy for Best Song Written for a Motion Picture, Television or Other Visual Media but lost to "Jai Ho" from Slumdog Millionaire.It was also nominated for Best Original Song at the 2008 Golden Globe Awards. Knowles' co-writers for the song were Amanda Ghost, Scott McFarnon, Ian Dench, James Dring and Jody Street. At the Golden Globes, "Once In a Lifetime" lost out to Bruce Springsteen's title track for the movie The Wrestler. The soundtrack spent 48 weeks at number one on the Top Blues Albums and it has sold over 165,000 copies in the US.

Track listing

Standard edition
 "I'm a Man" - Jeffrey Wright
 "At Last" - Beyoncé
 "No Particular Place to Go" - Mos Def
 "I'm Your Hoochie Coochie Man" - Jeffrey Wright
 "Once In a Lifetime" - Beyoncé
 "Let's Take a Walk" - Raphael Saadiq
 "6 o'Clock Blues" - Solange
 "Nadine" - Mos Def
 "The Sound" - Mary Mary
 "Last Night" - Little Walter
 "I'd Rather Go Blind" - Beyoncé
 "My Babe" - Columbus Short
 "Bridging the Gap" - Nas featuring Olu Dara

Deluxe edition (disc two)
 "Maybellene" - Mos Def
 "Forty Days and Forty Nights" - Buddy Guy
 "Trust in Me" - Beyoncé
 "Juke" - Soul Seven and Kim Wilson
 "Smokestack Lightnin'" - Eamonn Walker
 "Promised Land" - Mos Def
 "All I Could Do Was Cry" - Beyoncé
 "My Babe" - Elvis Presley
 "I Can't Be Satisfied" - Jeffrey Wright
 "Come On" - Mos Def
 "Country Blues" - Jeffrey Wright and Bill Sims
 "Evolution of a Man" - Q-Tip and Al Kapone
 "Radio Station" - Terence Blanchard

Chart performance

Weekly charts

Year-end charts

References 

Biographical film soundtracks
2008 soundtrack albums
Columbia Records soundtracks